The Day They Robbed the Bank of England is a 1959 crime novel by the British writer John Brophy.

Adaptation
The following year it was made into a film of the same title directed by John Guillermin and starring Aldo Ray, Elizabeth Sellars and Peter O'Toole.

References

Bibliography
 Goble, Alan. The Complete Index to Literary Sources in Film. Walter de Gruyter, 1999.
 Watson, George & Willison, Ian R. The New Cambridge Bibliography of English Literature, Volume 4. CUP, 1972.

1959 British novels
Novels set in London
British crime novels
British thriller novels
British novels adapted into films
Chatto & Windus books
Novels by John Brophy